Ohauiti is a semi-rural suburb of Tauranga in the Bay of Plenty region of New Zealand's North Island. The original Ohauiti, a rural settlement, is located 10 kilometres to the south of the city centre, although the name is also used for new suburban developments just to the north, on the city's built-up edge. It is within a 10-minute drive of central Tauranga, and a 2-minute drive from the Toi Ohomai Institute of Technology.

The New Zealand Ministry for Culture and Heritage gives a translation of "place of little wind" for Ōhauiti.

Ohauiti reserve has open fields and native bush walkways for picnics and off-leash dog walking. Ohauiti has a shopping centre with a takeaways shop, a Bottlezone, a hairdressing salon, and a Four Square.

Demographics

Ohauiti had a population of 3,282 at the 2018 New Zealand census, an increase of 600 people (22.4%) since the 2013 census, and an increase of 1,182 people (56.3%) since the 2006 census. There were 1,218 households, comprising 1,605 males and 1,677 females, giving a sex ratio of 0.96 males per female. The median age was 46.5 years (compared with 37.4 years nationally), with 558 people (17.0%) aged under 15 years, 498 (15.2%) aged 15 to 29, 1,482 (45.2%) aged 30 to 64, and 741 (22.6%) aged 65 or older.

Ethnicities were 90.2% European/Pākehā, 9.8% Māori, 1.1% Pacific peoples, 6.3% Asian, and 1.7% other ethnicities. People may identify with more than one ethnicity.

The percentage of people born overseas was 22.9, compared with 27.1% nationally.

Although some people chose not to answer the census's question about religious affiliation, 47.7% had no religion, 41.6% were Christian, 0.2% had Māori religious beliefs, 1.0% were Hindu, 0.4% were Muslim, 0.2% were Buddhist and 1.9% had other religions.

Of those at least 15 years old, 555 (20.4%) people had a bachelor's or higher degree, and 429 (15.7%) people had no formal qualifications. The median income was $34,200, compared with $31,800 nationally. 555 people (20.4%) earned over $70,000 compared to 17.2% nationally. The employment status of those at least 15 was that 1,287 (47.2%) people were employed full-time, 429 (15.7%) were part-time, and 75 (2.8%) were unemployed.

References

Suburbs of Tauranga